Sandro Foda (born 28 December 1989) is a German former professional footballer who played as a midfielder.

Career 
Foda was born in Mainz, Germany. He played for Sturm Graz and TSV Hartberg.

Personal life 
Foda is of Italian descent through his paternal grandfather. His father is former player Franco Foda. He has worked as a youth coach at SV Wildon.

References

1989 births
Living people
German sportspeople of Italian descent
Sportspeople from Mainz
German footballers
Association football midfielders
Footballers from Rhineland-Palatinate
Austrian Football Bundesliga players
SK Sturm Graz players
TSV Hartberg players
German expatriate footballers
German expatriate sportspeople in Austria
Expatriate footballers in Austria